Dansa Kourouma (born February 9, 1980 in Faranah) is a Guinean politician and has been president of the National Council of the Transition since .

Following the 2021 Guinean coup d'état, the council was made the acting legislative body of the Republic of Guinea.

References

Guinean politicians

Living people

1980 births